St Thomas More Catholic School may refer to:

St Thomas More Catholic School, Bedford, Bedfordshire, England
St Thomas More Catholic School, Willenhall, West Midlands, England